So Long at the Fair (US re-release title The Black Curse) is a 1950 British thriller film directed by Terence Fisher and Antony Darnborough, and starring Jean Simmons and Dirk Bogarde. It was adapted from the 1947 novel of the same name by Anthony Thorne.

Origin
The general plot derives from what appears to be a 19th-century urban legend, known variously as "The Vanishing Hotel Room" or "The Vanishing Lady", which has inspired several fictional works.

The first published version of the story was written by Nancy Vincent McClelland as "A Mystery of the Paris Exposition" in The Philadelphia Inquirer dated 14 November 1897. It next appeared in the Detroit Free Press in 1898 as "Porch Tales: The Disappearance of Mrs. Kneeb", by Kenneth Herford.

The German author Anselma Heine's novel Die Erscheinung (1912) covers the same idea, and it was filmed as a segment called 'The Apparition" in Unheimliche Geschichten (Uncanny stories) (1919, remake 1932). Belloc Lowndes' 1913 novel The End of Her Honeymoon also contains the tale, as does Lawrence Rising's 1920 She Who Was Helena Cass, Sir Basil Thomson's 1925 The Vanishing of Mrs. Fraser, and Ernest Hemingway's 1926 The Torrents of Spring. The German film Covered Tracks (1938) was based on the story, with a script by Thea von Harbou, and portions of the idea also featured in Alfred Hitchcock's 1938 film The Lady Vanishes.

The radio play "Cabin B-13" by John Dickson Carr tells a similar story. It aired three times in the series Suspense (twice in 1943 and once in 1949), and gave rise its own short-lived mystery radio series, Cabin B-13, after which it was adapted for television as "Cabin B-13" in the series Climax! (1958). It was then filmed as the theatrical release Dangerous Crossing (1953) and as the television movie Treacherous Crossing (1992).

On television, both the episode "Into Thin Air" (1955) of the anthology-series Alfred Hitchcock Presents and the episode "The Disappearance" (1967) of the TV-series The Big Valley were based on the same tale.

Later followed "Maybe You Will Remember", a variation told in Alvin Schwartz's book Scary Stories 3 (1991).

The film's title derives from the nursery rhyme "Oh Dear! What Can the Matter Be?".

Plot
In 1889, young Englishwoman Vicky Barton (Simmons) and her brother Johnny (David Tomlinson) arrive in Paris to see the Exposition Universelle. This is Vicky's first time in Paris, and after checking into a hotel, she drags her tired brother to dinner and the famous Moulin Rouge. She finally retires for the night, while Johnny has a late-night drink. When English painter George Hathaway (Bogarde) drops off his girlfriend, Rhoda O'Donovan (Honor Blackman), and her mother (Betty Warren) at the hotel, he asks Johnny for change for a 100 franc note to pay a carriage driver; Johnny lends him 50 francs and gives him his name and room number.

The next morning, Vicky finds a blank wall where Johnny's room used to be. When she questions hotel owner and manager Madame Hervé (Cathleen Nesbitt), the latter claims she arrived alone. The room number now adorns the common bathroom. Madame Hervé's brother Narcisse (Marcel Pontin) and the day porter (Eugene Deckers) back up her story.

Frantic, Vicky goes to see the British consul (Felix Aylmer), followed secretly by Narcisse. She has no proof of her brother's existence, so the consul can only suggest she find a witness, Nina (Zena Marshall), the hotel maid who attended her. Nina had informed her that she was going up in a balloon with her boyfriend at the Exposition that day. Tragically, she is too late. Before she can talk to Nina, the balloon ascends, bursts into flames, and plummets to the ground, killing the two passengers.

Vicky tries the French police commissaire (Austin Trevor). He questions Madame Hervé and her brother, but can find nothing amiss in their story. Since her room has been reserved for only two nights, Vicky has to leave the hotel. Madame Hervé offers her a ticket home to England, which she is forced to accept, as she has little money left. However, unbeknownst to either party, Rhoda O'Donovan has been asked by George Hathaway to deliver a letter containing his loan repayment to Johnny. Not finding his room, Rhoda slips the envelope under Vicky's door, where she finds it.

Vicky goes to see George. When he confirms having met her brother, she bursts into tears. He offers his assistance. George notices there are six balconies, but only five rooms on the floor, and finds the missing hotel room, the entrance having been covered over to be part of the wall.

Under questioning by the police, Madame Hervé reveals where Johnny has been taken. It turns out that he became sick with bubonic plague during the night. The news would have been disastrous for the Exposition, so he was secretly taken away to a hospital. George brings along Doctor Hart (André Morell), who tells Vicky her brother has a chance of living.

Cast

Jean Simmons as Vicky Barton
Dirk Bogarde as George Hathaway
David Tomlinson as Johnny Barton
Marcel Poncin as Narcisse
Cathleen Nesbitt as Madame Hervé
Honor Blackman as Rhoda O'Donovan
Betty Warren as Mrs. O'Donovan
Zena Marshall as Nina
Eugene Deckers as Day Porter
Felix Aylmer as British Consul
André Morell as Doctor Hart
Austin Trevor as Police Commissaire
Natasha Sokolova as Charlotte
Nelly Arno as Madame Verni

Music
The music, by Benjamin Frankel, includes a sequence accompanying a ride in a carriage which went on to become a popular light concert item under the title Carriage and Pair.

Production
Betty Box was appointed producer at the last minute when Antony Darborough was held up on The Astonished Heart. The film was to have cast Françoise Rosay but she dropped out to go to Hollywood.

It was shot at Pinewood Studios. The film's sets were designed by the art directors Cedric Dawe and George Provis. The costumes were designed by Elizabeth Haffenden.

Reception
The film performed solidly at the box office.

References

External links

So Long at the Fair at Film Fanatic
So Long at the Fair at Turner Classic Movies
The Vanishing Hotel Room on Urban Legends Reference Pages (snopes.com)

1950 films
1950s historical thriller films
British historical thriller films
British mystery thriller films
1950s mystery thriller films
Films directed by Terence Fisher
Films about missing people
Films based on British novels
Films based on urban legends
Films shot at Pinewood Studios
Films produced by Sydney Box
Films produced by Betty Box
Films scored by Benjamin Frankel
Films set in 1889
Films set in Paris
Gainsborough Pictures films
British black-and-white films
1950s English-language films
1950s British films
Locked-room mysteries